The field hockey tournament at the 1948 Summer Olympics was the sixth edition of the field hockey event at the Summer Olympics.

In five Olympic hockey tournaments, there had only been two different winners, but Britain and India had never competed together at the Olympics. There was no question the UK would again be absent at their home Olympics, although there were some organizational difficulties. First of all, the four British nations were independently affiliated with the international federation FIH and were not very keen on cooperating. Also, there were no hockey grounds to train on, as these were used by cricketers during the summer. Still, they managed to put together a team, the first real British hockey team at the Olympics (the 1908 and 1920 champions had been composed entirely of English players). Their captain was the versatile Norman Borrett, a first-class cricketer and national squash champion who once qualified for Wimbledon but didn't have time to compete.

The fixtures were announced on 19 June 1948. Revised fixtures were announced on 28 July. Britain and India were seeded, along with Pakistan and the Netherlands. Pakistan had only separated from India the previous year and made their first Olympic appearance in London. One of the team members, Ali Iqtidar Shah Dara, had been on the golden Indian team of 1936. All four ranked teams made the semis, although the Brits were held to a goalless draw by Switzerland, and Pakistan crushed the Dutch 6–1 in their group match. The semi-finals were close, and British observers considered the Indians to be lucky to get away with a 2–1 win against the Dutch. With Britain beating Pakistan, the gold medal match would finally see India play the Britons. Completely focused on its defense, Britain was unable to keep up with the fast-paced Indians, and they lost it 4–0. The bronze went to the Netherlands, beating Pakistan 4–2 in a replay of the first 3rd place match, which had ended in a draw.

Participating nations
 
 
 
 
 
 
  (H)
 
 
 
 
 
 

(*) NOTE: There are only players counted, which participated in one game at least.
(H) Host

Squads
A total of 187(*) field hockey players from 13 nations competed at the London Games

Results

Group stage
The first of each group and also the second of Group C qualified for the Semi-finals.

Group A

Group B

Group C

Finals

Semi-finals

Bronze medal match

Gold medal match

Final standings

Medal summary

Note: The International Olympic Committee medal database shows also only these players as medalists. They all played at least one match during the tournament. The reserve players are not listed as medalists.

See also
 Gold (2018 film), about the Indian national hockey team at the 1948 Summer Olympics

References 

 
Field hockey at the Summer Olympics
1948 Summer Olympics events
1948
1948 in field hockey